John W. Sedwick (born March 13, 1946) is a senior United States district judge of the United States District Court for the District of Alaska.

Education and career

Sedwick was born in 1946 in Kittanning, Pennsylvania. He attended Dartmouth College where he received a Bachelor of Arts degree in 1968. He then served in the United States Air Force as a Sergeant from 1969 to 1971. He graduated with a Juris Doctor from Harvard Law School in 1972. Later, he went into private practice in Anchorage, Alaska from 1972 to 1981. He then served as the Director of the Division of Land and Water Management of the Department of Natural Resources, State of Alaska from 1981 to 1982. He returned to private practice from 1982 to 1992.

Federal judicial service

Sedwick was nominated by George H. W. Bush on July 2, 1992, to the United States District Court for the District of Alaska, to a seat vacated by Judge Andrew Kleinfeld. He was confirmed by the United States Senate on October 8, 1992, and received his commission on October 9, 1992. He served as Chief Judge from 2002 to 2009. On March 13, 2011, John W. Sedwick assumed senior status. He was succeeded by Judge Sharon L. Gleason.

References

Sources
 

People from Kittanning, Pennsylvania
Lawyers from Anchorage, Alaska
Judges of the United States District Court for the District of Alaska
Dartmouth College alumni
Harvard Law School alumni
United States district court judges appointed by George H. W. Bush
20th-century American judges
1946 births
Living people
21st-century American judges